The Tseax Cone, also called the Tseax River Cone or the Aiyansh Volcano,  is a young and active cinder cone and adjacent lava flows associated with the Nass Ranges and the Northern Cordilleran Volcanic Province.

The Tseax Cone is one of the most accessible volcanic centres in British Columbia.

Geology

The Tseax Cone is in the southern part of the Northern Cordilleran Volcanic Province and is therefore part of the Ring of Fire. It has been the site of some of the youngest volcanic eruptions in Canada. It has been active at least twice in the past few hundred years and other remnants of lava flows exist in the area. The volcano is made of volcanic bombs and cinders with a crater at its summit where a churning lava lake poured and overflowed its rim during the 18th century.

Volcanism at the Tseax Cone is caused by the rifting of the Earth's crust where two parts of the North American Plate are breaking apart. The rifting is the result of the Pacific Plate sliding northward along the transform Queen Charlotte Fault, on its way to the Aleutian Trench.

The lava emitted in eruptions at the Tseax Cone is fluid. Its lavas are made of basalt, a common grey to black or dark brown extrusive volcanic rock low in silica content (the lava is mafic) that is usually fine-grained due to rapid cooling of lava on the Earth's surface. Pāhoehoe is found at the volcano, which has a smooth, billowy, undulating, or ropy surface. A pāhoehoe flow typically advances as a series of small lodes and toes that continually break out from a cooled crust. It also forms lava tubes where the minimal heat loss maintains low viscosity.  However, there is also basaltic lava at the volcano characterized by a rough or rubbly surface composed of clinker called ʻaʻā. The clinkery surface covers a massive dense core, which is the most active part of the flow. As pasty lava in the core travels downslope, the clinkers are carried along at the surface.

17th-century eruption

The Tseax Cone was the source for a major lava flow eruption between 1668 and 1714 that travelled into the Tseax River, dammed it, and formed Lava Lake.

The Nass River valley contains abundant tree casts and lava tubes. The tree casts were formed when the hot lava flow burned out tree trunks and left holes in the lava. Lava tubes formed when the low-viscosity hot alkali basaltic lava travelled beneath the surface, which eventually flowed out and left the crust as the roof and walls of the tubes.

Legends of the Nisga'a people tell of a prolonged period of disruption by the volcano, including the destruction of two Nisga'a villages. Several Nisga'a people dug pits for shelter but approximately 2,000 Nisga'a people died from volcanic gases and poisonous smoke (most likely from asphyxiation by carbon dioxide). The Nisga'a story of the destruction is Canada's worst known geological disaster.

It is the only eruption in Canada for which legends of First Nations people have been verified. The lava flow can also be found near modern Nisga'a villages, such as Gitlakdamix. This eruption is just one of hundreds that have modified the landscape of western Canada over the past million years.

It has recently been suggested that the Tseax eruption was related to the Cascadia earthquake of 26 January 1700, which was the most powerful earthquake during the last 1000 years in the Pacific Northwest. 

Before the 17th century eruption, the Tseax Cone had erupted in 1325.

Potential for a future eruption
Today, the volcano lies dormant within Nisga'a Memorial Lava Beds Provincial Park. Gases currently being emitted by the volcano are evidence that the volcano is still active and potentially dangerous. Signs of unrest such as seismic activity and increased gas output will almost certainly precede any future eruptive activity from the Tseax Cone.

If the Tseax Cone were to erupt, its effects would be felt throughout the interior of British Columbia. There may be a repeat of the poisonous gas disaster that happened to the Nisga'a people during the last eruption. If the lava flows are voluminous enough, they could spark forest fires and dam local rivers, crippling the local ecosystem. This would have disastrous short-term consequences for the important salmon fisheries found along the Nass River system.

Further study and monitoring of the volcano is necessary in order to predict when the Tseax Cone might erupt, perhaps giving those living downslope and downwind the opportunity to evacuate, much like that which preceded the 1980 eruption of Mount St. Helens.

See also
 List of disasters in Canada
 List of disasters in Canada by death toll
 List of Northern Cordilleran volcanoes
 List of volcanic eruptions by death toll
 List of volcanoes in Canada
 Northern Cordilleran Volcanic Province
 Volcanology of Canada
 Volcanology of Western Canada

References

External links
 Volcano World 
 "Ignis: a Parable of the Great Lava Plain in the Valley of Eternal Bloom, Naas River, British Columbia (1918)
 BCGNIS Geographic Name Details: Tseax Cone 

Cinder cones of British Columbia
Rift volcanoes
Natural disasters in British Columbia
Nass Country
Northern Cordilleran Volcanic Province
18th-century volcanic events
Active volcanoes
18th-century natural disasters
Nisga'a
Hazelton Mountains
Polygenetic cinder cones